Christa Worthington (December 23, 1956 – January 6, 2002) was a United States fashion writer who worked for Women's Wear Daily, Cosmopolitan, ELLE, Harper's Bazaar, and The New York Times. She was also a co-author of several books on fashion and formerly dated Stan Stokowski, the oldest son of Gloria Vanderbilt and Leopold Stokowski.

Worthington was stabbed to death at her home in Truro, Massachusetts (on Cape Cod).  Her body was found on January 6, 2002, with her two-year-old daughter, Ava, clinging to it.  The child was unharmed.

On April 15, 2005, a local garbage collector, Christopher McCowen, was arrested and charged with her rape and murder. On November 16, 2006, he was found guilty in Barnstable Superior Court of first-degree murder, rape and burglary, and sentenced to life without parole.  In January 2008, a hearing was held due to three jurors' separate allegations that racism was involved in the deliberations.  In December 2010, the Massachusetts Supreme Judicial Court denied an appeal for a new trial.

External links
Christa Worthington, murder on Cape Cod
News coverage of events leading to trial and trial coverage
48 Hours, Murder on the Cape (originally aired March 6, 2007)
Murder on the Cape movie (2017)

Links to some articles written by Worthington:
NYC Times Article on African fertility dolls
NYT News Service article on Navigational Aids

References

People from Truro, Massachusetts
1956 births
2002 deaths
People murdered in Massachusetts
Deaths by stabbing in the United States
Incidents of violence against women
20th-century American non-fiction writers
History of women in Massachusetts